Rhea (or Rea) Silvia, also known as Ilia (as well as other names) was the mythical mother of the twins Romulus and Remus, who founded the city of Rome. Her story is told in the first book of Ab Urbe Condita Libri of Livy and in Cassius Dio's Roman History. The Legend of Rhea Silvia recounts how she was raped by Mars while she was a Vestal Virgin and as a result became the mother of Romulus and Remus, the founders of Rome. This event was portrayed numerous times in Roman art and mentioned in the Aeneid and the works of Ovid.  Modern academics consider both how Rhea Silvia is relevant for the treatment of rape victims in Roman mythology as well as the different ways she is portrayed in Roman art.

Legend 

According to Livy's account of the legend, she was the daughter of Numitor, king of Alba Longa, and descended from Aeneas. Numitor's younger brother Amulius seized the throne and killed Numitor's son, then forced Rhea Silvia to become a Vestal Virgin, a priestess of the goddess Vesta. As Vestal Virgins were sworn to celibacy, this would ensure the line of Numitor had no heirs. Rhea, however, became pregnant with the twins Romulus and Remus by the god Mars.

According to Plutarch, she believed this because she saw her children being cared for by a woodpecker and a wolf – animals sacred to Mars. The account says that Rhea Silvia went to a grove sacred to Mars to get water for use in the temple where she encountered Mars who attempted to rape her, she ran into a cave to escape him but to no avail. Mars then promised that her children would be great. These claims of her children's paternity were later doubted by the Roman historian Livy.

Vesta, to show her displeasure at the birth of Rhea Silvia's children, caused the holy fire in her temple to go out, shook her altar, and shut the eyes of her image. According to Ennius, the goddess Venus was more sympathetic to Rhea Silvia's plight.

When Amulius learned of the birth he imprisoned Rhea Silvia and ordered a servant to kill the twins. But the servant showed mercy and set them adrift on the river Tiber, which, overflowing, left the infants in a pool by the bank. There, a she-wolf (lupa), who had just lost her own cubs, suckled them. Rhea Silvia was herself spared from death due to the intercession of Amulius' daughter Antho. According to Ovid, Rhea Silvia ultimately threw herself into the Tiber.

Romulus and Remus overthrew Amulius and reinstated Numitor as king in 752 BCE. They would then go to found Rome.

In Roman art 

Despite Livy's euhemerist and realist deflation of this myth, it is clear that the story of her seduction by Mars continued to be widely accepted. This is demonstrated by the recurring theme of Mars discovering Rhea Silvia in Roman arts: In bas-relief on the Casali Altar (Vatican Museums), in engraved couched glass on the Portland Vase (British Museum), or on a sarcophagus in the Palazzo Mattei. Mars' discovery of Rhea Silvia is a prototype of the "invention scene" ("discovery scene") familiar in Roman art; Greek examples are furnished by Dionysus and Ariadne or Selene and Endymion.

The Portland Vase features a scene that has been interpreted as a depiction of the "invention", or coming-upon, of Rhea Sylvia by Mars.

In the Museo Nazionale Romano there is a depiction of Rhea Silvia sleeping during the conception of Romulus and Remus in a Relief.

In Roman literature 
In a version presented by Ovid's Fasti, it is the river Anio who takes pity on her and invites her to rule his realm.

In Virgil's Aeneid, Anchises gives a prophecy that Rhea Silvia would give birth to Romulus and Remus by Mars.

Rhea Silvia's bearing of Romulus is mentioned in the Roman work, Vigil of Venus.

Academic analyses 
 In an article by Rosanna Lauriola, Rhea Silvia is held up as an example of how rape victims in Roman myths are valued more as the mothers and catalysts for change than as individuals in their own right.
 A paper by Revika Gersht and Sonia Muryink divides the images of Rhea Silvia's conception by Mars into as many as seven different types.

Modern literature 
 In David Drake's science fiction story "To Bring the Light", the time travelling protagonist meets a completely human Rhea Silvia, a sympathetic peasant living in a small shepherd community on Palatine Hill in what would become the city of Rome.
 In Rick Riordan's novel The Mark of Athena, Annabeth Chase meets Rhea Silvia and the god of the river Tiber in the forms of Audrey Hepburn and Gregory Peck's characters from the movie Roman Holiday.
 Rhea Silvia is the central character in Debra May Macleod’s historical fiction novel RHEA SILVIA.

See also

 Ilia (name)
 Aeneas
 Founding of Rome
 Rhea (mythology)
 Tiberinus (god)

Footnotes

References

External links 
 
 

8th-century BC clergy
8th-century BC Roman women
Ancient Roman religion
Mortal parents of demigods in classical mythology
Mythological rape victims
People from Alba Longa
Rhea (mythology)
Characters in Roman mythology
Vestal Virgins